Polygala xanthina is a plant species in the family Polygalaceae. The colour of its flowers have been described as greenish purple, bluish, yellowish, or pinkish.

References

xanthina